Steven Hetherington (born 9 March 1993) is an English professional footballer who plays as a midfielder for Arbroath, on loan from Falkirk. He has previously played for Motherwell, Airdrie United, Celtic Nation, Crook Town and Alloa Athletic.

Career
Hetherington started his football career at local club Hartlepool United, and was at Victoria Park up until July 2009, when SPL club Rangers signed him. He was immediately drafted into the under-19 team.

His chances at Ibrox were limited, and he was released by the club in July 2011, after not making a single first team appearance. He was then given a trial at fellow SPL club Motherwell, and did enough to earn a short-term contract at the Fir Park club. Despite not making a first team appearance in the 2011–12 season, Hetherington's good performances for the Under 19 team earned him a contract extension with the club.

After several former youth players were released by Motherwell, his chances of a first team appearance increased. Indeed, on 11 August 2012, he made his competitive first-team debut as a substitute for Keith Lasley in a 1–1 draw with St. Johnstone.

On 7 February 2013, after making just 4 appearances for Motherwell in the 2012–13 season, Hetherington went on a months loan to Lanarkshire derby rivals Airdrie United. That loan was then extended till the end of the season.

On 20 May 2013, Hetherington left Motherwell after failing to earn a contract extension with the Fir Park club.

After spells at English non-league clubs Celtic Nation and Crook Town, Hetherington signed for Scottish Championship club Alloa Athletic on 30 July 2014.

Hetherington signed for Falkirk in June 2021. He was appointed club captain two months later.

Career statistics

References

1993 births
Living people
Footballers from Hartlepool
People educated at English Martyrs School and Sixth Form College
English footballers
Association football midfielders
Hartlepool United F.C. players
Rangers F.C. players
Motherwell F.C. players
Airdrieonians F.C. players
Celtic Nation F.C. players
Crook Town A.F.C. players
Falkirk F.C. players
Arbroath F.C. players
Alloa Athletic F.C. players
Scottish Premier League players
Scottish Football League players
Scottish Professional Football League players